Romane Miradoli (born 10 March 1994) is a French World Cup alpine ski racer. Born in Bonneville, Haute-Savoie, she has competed for France in two World Championships and two Winter Olympics.

Miradoli made her World Cup debut in December 2012 and her first podium was a Super-G victory in March 2022.

World Cup results

Season standings

Race podiums
 1 win – (1 SG) 
 2 podiums – (2 SG); 25 top tens

World Championship results

Olympic results

References

External links

1994 births
Living people
French female alpine skiers
Alpine skiers at the 2018 Winter Olympics
Alpine skiers at the 2022 Winter Olympics
Olympic alpine skiers of France
Sportspeople from Haute-Savoie
Université Savoie-Mont Blanc alumni